Meet With Me was recorded live at San Diego, Ca cafe club "LeStats West" on 11/04/2010. The show also included bands Fairmount Extension and hING! This album, contains 12 tracks from the show. The recording give the listener a chance to hear the 21st Century "Cardiac Kidz". The Cardiac Kidz showcased their ability to cross music genres and generations by producing music that treads over both punk rock, and alternative rock. It was released on December 1, 2010 on Blindspot Records on the same day as Rarities 1979-1981.

Track listing

Personnel

Cardiac Kidz
 Jim Ryan - lead vocals, bass
 Jerry Flack - lead guitar, backing vocals
 David Rinck- rhythm guitar, vocals
 Jimmi Flynn - drums,

Production
 Digital Release produced by Bart Mendoza, Blindspot Records, San Diego, CA
 Mastered by Dave Fleminger at Metronoma Studios, San Francisco, CA
 Art Direction by Bart Mendoza and Jim Ryan
 Graphic Design: Kristen Tobiason

2010 albums